Marcel Garrouste (22 April 1921 – 5 September 2021) was a French politician. A member of the Socialist Party (PS), he served as a member of the National Assembly from 1978 to 1986 and again from 1988 to 1993.

Biography
He was elected to the National Assembly in 1976, serving Lot-et-Garonne's 3rd constituency and was re-elected in 1981. He returned to the National Assembly in 1988 before retiring in 1993. He published his autobiography in 2018.

Marcel Garrouste died on 5 September 2021 at the age of 100.

Books
Modes de vie et traditions populaires en Quercy et en Agenais (2015)
Un paysan à l'Assemblée nationale (2018)

References

1921 births
2021 deaths
People from Lot-et-Garonne
Socialist Party (France) politicians
Deputies of the 9th National Assembly of the French Fifth Republic
Deputies of the 6th National Assembly of the French Fifth Republic
Mayors of places in Nouvelle-Aquitaine
French general councillors
French centenarians
Deputies of the 7th National Assembly of the French Fifth Republic
French autobiographers
21st-century French male writers
Men centenarians